Hassinger is a surname. Notable people with the surname include:

David Hassinger (1927–2007), American Grammy award-winning recording engineer and record producer
Maren Hassinger (born 1947), African-American artist and educator

See also
Haslinger